Neohelvibotys boliviensis is a moth in the family Crambidae described by Hahn William Capps in 1967. It is found in Bolivia.

The wingspan is about 19 mm. Adults have been recorded on wing in December.

References

Moths described in 1967
Pyraustinae